Anastasiya Bespalova is a Russian composer.

Biography
Bespalova is a graduate of the Urals Mussorgsky State Conservatoire where she studied music composition under Vladimir Kobekin. In 2003 she won the First Opus young composers competition in Moscow. She later won the Mariinsky Theatre's young composers competition for an opera based on a subject by Nikolai Gogol with her one-act work Shponka and His Aunt. The opera premiered at the Mariinsky Theatre on 21 June 2009.

Bespalova's works have also been performed at several music festivals including the New Music Days Festival in Yekaterinburg. Several of her works have been performed in concert at the Youth Academies of Russia, including the symphonic work Secrets of a Wild Wood, the string quartet A Clockwork Orange, and her choral work with saxophone and piano, A Hymn to the Sun.

References
Biography of Anastasiya Bespalova at the Mariinsky Theatre 

Year of birth missing (living people)
Living people
Russian opera composers
Russian women classical composers
Place of birth missing (living people)
21st-century classical composers
21st-century women composers